Taldy-Bulak (Taldıbolaq) is a rural locality (a village) in Vosmomartovsky Selsoviet, Yermekeyevsky District, Bashkortostan, Russia. The population was 44 as of 2010. There are 3 streets.

Geography 
Taldy-Bulak is located 72 km south of Yermekeyevo (the district's administrative centre) by road. Novoshakovo is the nearest rural locality.

References 

Rural localities in Yermekeyevsky District